"Supper-Time" is a song written by Ira Stanphill and originally recorded and released as a single in 1953 by Jimmie Davis with Anita Kerr Singers.

The song has been covered by many artists, including Johnny Cash (in 1958), Jim Reeves (1959), Faron Young (1959), Porter Wagoner (1968), Burl Ives (1969), Conway Twitty (1973), and Pat Boone (1973).

References 

1953 songs
1953 singles
Songs written by Ira Stanphill
Decca Records singles
Jimmie Davis songs
Johnny Cash songs
Jim Reeves songs
Faron Young songs
Porter Wagoner songs
Burl Ives songs
Conway Twitty songs
Pat Boone songs